was an old province in the area that is today Fukushima Prefecture. It was sometimes called .

History 
 This iteration of Iwaki Province was established in Meiji Era.  It was cut out of Mutsu Province and corresponded to the eastern part of modern Fukushima Prefecture on December 17 of 1868 of Japanese calendar, which is January 19, 1869 of Gregorian calendar.  Its population in 1872 was 348,608.

Historical districts
 Miyagi Prefecture
 Igu District (伊具郡)
 Katta District (刈田郡)
 Watari District (亘理郡)
 Fukushima Prefecture
 Nakadōri Region, Fukushima
 Ishikawa District (石川郡)
 Shirakawa District (白川郡, a.k.a. Higashishirakawa or East Shirakawa)
 Shirakawa District (白河郡, a.k.a. Nishishirakwa or West Shirakawa)
 Tamura District (田村郡)
 Hamadōri Region, Fukushima
 Iwaki District (磐城郡) - absorbed Iwasaki and Kikuta Districts to become a new and expanded Iwaki District (石城郡) on April 1, 1896
 Iwasaki District (磐前郡) - merged into Iwaki District (along with Kikuta District) on April 1, 1896
 Kikuta District (菊多郡) - merged into Iwaki District (along with Iwasaki District) on April 1, 1896
 Namekata District (行方郡) - merged with Uda District to become Sōma District on April 1, 1896
 Naraha District (楢葉郡) - merged with Shineha District to become Futaba District on April 1, 1896
 Shineha District (標葉郡) - merged with Naraha District to become Futaba District on April 1, 1896
 Uda District (宇多郡) - merged with Namekata District to become Sōma District on April 1, 1896

See also
 Sanriku
 Iwaki Province (718), early forerunner.

Notes

References
 Nussbaum, Louis-Frédéric and Käthe Roth. (2005).  Japan encyclopedia. Cambridge: Harvard University Press. ;  OCLC 58053128

Other websites

  Murdoch's map of provinces, 1903

1868 establishments in Japan
Former provinces of Japan